Coalition Provisional Authority Order Number 2: Dissolution of Entities signed by Coalition Provisional Authority on 23 May 2003, disbanded the Iraqi military, security, and intelligence infrastructure of President Saddam Hussein. It has since become an object of controversy, cited by some critics as the biggest American mistake made in the immediate aftermath of the fall of Saddam Hussein and as one of the main causes of the rise of the Islamic State of Iraq and the Levant (ISIL/ISIS).

Background
Before the war began, retired US Army Lieutenant General Jay Garner and the US military had already laid out several plans for what to do with Iraqi security forces. Recognizing the danger posed by complete demobilization in an environment of high unemployment, poor security, and social unrest, the plan called for the dissolution of the Iraqi Republican Guard, the engagement of soldiers in the Iraqi Army in reconstruction efforts, and the foundation of a new army from three to five existing Iraqi divisions; this plan was presented to President George W. Bush by Under Secretary of Defense for Policy Douglas Feith during a National Security Council (NSC) meeting on 12 May.

Beginning on 20 March 2003, the United States and coalition partners launched the invasion of Iraq. On 21 April, the Coalition Provisional Authority (CPA) was established with Jay Garner at its head, and on 11 May he was replaced by Ambassador Paul Bremer. Bremer's first order as CPA administrator, issued 16 May, disestablished the Iraqi Baath Party and began a process of "de-Ba'athification."

Formulation of the order
Upon arrival in Baghdad, Bremer and his senior advisor, Walter B. Slocombe, came to favor the dissolution of the Iraqi Army. This view was based on the belief that the Iraqi Army had already demobilized itself and could not be practically reconstituted, e.g., the Iraqi conscripts would not return, and in any case Iraqi military facilities had been destroyed. In the words of Slocombe, "There was no intact Iraqi force to 'disband.'" As to who originally proposed the idea, it has been sometimes attributed to Slocombe; Feith stated that it was Bremer's idea, but Bremer has denied that and said he could not remember who had initially come up with the idea.

According to Bremer in his book My Year in Iraq, the CPA and the Pentagon jointly coordinated the drafting of the order to disband the Iraqi defense and security services. Bremer, highlighting that such an order would be critical in eliminating the foundations of the previous Iraqi regime and demonstrating "to the Iraqi people that...neither Saddam nor his gang is coming back," sent a proposal for the disbandment to then Secretary of Defense Donald Rumsfeld on 19 May, along with a recommendation that all former troops save some top intelligence, security, and Baathist leaders be given severance payments. Under Secretary of Defense Feith requested some editing of the text on 22 May, and that night Rumsfeld chief of staff Lawrence Di Rita and CPA spokesperson Dan Senor coordinated plans for the actual announcement. After receiving permission from Secretary Rumsfeld, Bremer briefed President Bush by video conference and subsequently signed the order on 23 May.

However, Bush said in a later interview that the initial plan was to maintain the Iraqi Army, and he was not sure why that did not occur. In response to this report, Bremer provided The New York Times with a letter sent by him on 22 May through the Secretary of Defense to the President that described the measure, to which the President sent a thank you letter. Furthermore, Bremer stated that even before he arrived in Iraq, he sent a draft of the order on 9 May to Rumsfeld, Wolfowitz, Feith, the Joint Chiefs of Staff, and then CFLCC Commander, Lieutenant General David McKiernan. The Times quoted an anonymous White House official that the original plan to maintain the army could not be carried out and that Bush understood that.

General Peter Pace later stated that the Joint Chiefs of Staff were not consulted for advice or a recommendation with regard to the order. Secretary of State Colin Powell has also said he was never consulted on the matter, which he believes was a major mistake, and then National Security Advisor Condoleezza Rice was said to have been surprised by the decision.

A different set of events was portrayed by Bob Woodward in his book State of Denial. According to him, the decision never came back to Washington for input except for a lawyer from the National Security Council, who gave legal opinions on the first two CPA orders. Rumsfeld said he spoke only rarely with Bremer, no NSC meeting had been convened on the matter, and that he "would be surprised" if either Deputy Secretary of Defense Paul Wolfowitz or Under Secretary Feith had told Bremer to carry out the two CPA orders.

UK input
Several British generals later said that they raised concern about the disbandment and were personally against it, though Bremer responded that no UK officials voiced concerns in their meetings and that they regarded the effective demobilization of the Iraqi military as a "fait accompli". These claims were disputed by senior British officers. A 2004 report in The Guardian cited senior UK military and intelligence sources saying that British Admiral Michael Boyce told his commanders to negotiate with senior Iraqi Army and Republican Guard officers to switch sides and operate under UK guidance to uphold law and order, but that CPA orders 1 and 2 effectively destroyed any chance to regroup the Iraqi forces for such a plan.

Aftermath
On 13 September Bremer amended the order through CPA order number 34, which stated that the Board of Supreme Audit was no longer to be considered a dissolved entity and should continue operations.

In an interview with PBS's Frontline, Bremer went on record saying, "I think the decision not to recall Saddam's army, from a political point of view, is the single most important correct decision that we made in the 14 months we were there."

Dissolved entities

Institutions
Ministry of Defense
Ministry of Information
Ministry of State for Military Affairs
Iraqi Intelligence Service
National Security Bureau
Directorate of General Security
Special Security Organization
Entities affiliated with Hussein bodyguards:
Murafaqin (Companions)
Himaya al Khasa (Special Guard)

Military organizations
Iraqi Army, Air Force, Navy, the Air Defense Force, and other regular military services
Iraqi Republican Guard
Iraqi Special Republican Guard
Directorate of Military Intelligence
Jerusalem Army
Emergency Forces

Paramilitaries
Fedayeen Saddam
Ba'ath Party Militia
Friends of Saddam
Saddam's Lion Cubs (Ashbal Saddam)

Other
Presidential Diwan
Presidential Secretariat
Revolutionary Command Council
The National Assembly
The Youth Organization (al-Futuwah)
National Olympic Committee
Revolutionary, Special and National Security Courts

References

External links
Why Iraq Has No Army
Who Disbanded the Iraqi Army?

2
Military history of Iraq
2003 in Iraq